The 2018 FC Aktobe season is the 24th successive season that the club playing in the Kazakhstan Premier League, the highest tier of association football in Kazakhstan. Aktobe will also participate in the Kazakhstan Cup.

Season events
After starting the season with a transfer ban, Aktobe were allowed to register new players on 20 March 2018. On 27 April, Aktobe had six points deducted as a punishment for unpaid debts to former player Danilo Neco.

Squad

Transfers

Winter

In:

Out:

Trial:

Summer

In:

Out:

Friendlies

Competitions

Premier League

Results summary

Results by round

Results

League table

Kazakhstan Cup

Squad statistics

Appearances and goals

|-
|colspan="14"|Players away from Aktobe on loan:
|-
|colspan="14"|Players who left Aktobe during the season:

|}

Goal scorers

Disciplinary record

References

External links
 

FC Aktobe seasons
Aktobe